Typhlomangelia magna is an extinct species of sea snail, a marine gastropod mollusc in the family Borsoniidae.

Description

Distribution
This extinct marine species is endemic to New Zealand.

References

 Maxwell, P.A. (2009). Cenozoic Mollusca. pp. 232–254 in Gordon, D.P. (ed.) New Zealand inventory of biodiversity. Volume one. Kingdom Animalia: Radiata, Lophotrochozoa, Deuterostomia. Canterbury University Press, Christchurch.

External links
   Bouchet P., Kantor Yu.I., Sysoev A. & Puillandre N. (2011) A new operational classification of the Conoidea. Journal of Molluscan Studies 77: 273-308

magna
Gastropods described in 1969
Gastropods of New Zealand